The 1954 Omloop Het Volk was the tenth edition of the Omloop Het Volk cycle race and was held on 14 March 1954. The race started and finished in Ghent. The race was won by Karel De Baere.

General classification

References

1954
Omloop Het Nieuwsblad
Omloop Het Nieuwsblad